In computing, the Java Debug Wire Protocol (JDWP) is a communication protocol which is part of the Java Platform Debugger Architecture. It is used for communication between a debugger and the Java Virtual Machine, which it debugs. It allows to debug processes on a different computer. It can work over a network socket or through shared memory.

The protocol is implemented in the software library libjdwp. It can be activated using the -Xrunjdwp parameter of Java. The default TCP port used for the protocol is 8000.

Metasploit includes a module for JDWP. It can exploit it using various scripts, which have functions such as injecting a Java class that executes a shell command, returns operating system details or injects an arbitrary class.

References

External links 
 Java Debug Wire Protocol - Java SE Documentation
 Hacking the Java Debug Wire Protocol by IOActive
 Patent US20110138359A1 -  Modified implementation of java debug wire protocol
 JDWP Misconfiguration in Container Images and K8s

Debugging
Communications protocols
Java (programming language)